The Levi Snell House is a house with Greek Revival and Italianate architecture in Fayetteville, New York.  It was built in 1855 and was listed on the National Register of Historic Places in 1987.

It's a "substantial, largely intact, mid-nineteenth century brick residence which illustrates the residential designs frequently favored by the prosperous but conservative merchant classes in small upstate New York communities of that period.  The house incorporates square massing of the relatively new Italianate style, such as wide eaves and a bracketed cornice, into a traditional five-bay center hall-plan residence with porches, doors and windows treated in the older Greek Revival style."

Its first two owners were Levi Snell and Marquis L. Peck.

References

Houses on the National Register of Historic Places in New York (state)
Italianate architecture in New York (state)
Houses completed in 1855
Houses in Onondaga County, New York
Manlius, New York
National Register of Historic Places in Onondaga County, New York